Francisco Ilarregui (born 6 May 1997) is an Argentine professional footballer who plays as a forward for Defensores de Belgrano, on loan from Argentinos Juniors.

Career
Ilarregui's first senior career club became Quilmes in 2014. He made his professional debut in the Argentine Primera División against Arsenal de Sarandí on 8 September, prior to scoring his first goal three appearances later versus Vélez Sarsfield; which was his first career start. Seven more appearances followed across the following three campaigns in all competitions, prior to experiencing his breakthrough campaign after featuring twenty-two times and netting two goals during the 2017–18 Primera B Nacional season.

In June 2018, Alcobendas Sport of Spain's Tercera División agreed terms with Quilmes for Ilarregui. However, the transfer stalled after the Spanish side failed to present a secondary payment to Quilmes in order to complete the transaction. On 7 August, Argentine Primera División team Argentinos Juniors announced a loan deal had been reached for Ilarregui. However, that was questioned in a statement by Quilmes hours later. Finally, on 9 August, Argentinos announced that a permanent transfer had been agreed with Quilmes; with Ilarregui signing a three-year contract. He made his debut on 21 August against Unión Santa Fe.

In January 2020, following one goal (versus Tigre) in six appearances for Argentinos, Ilarregui was loaned out to Primera B Nacional with former club Quilmes until June 2021. However, the loan spell was terminated half way through due to lack of playing time, at Ilarregui was instead loaned out to Platense in February 2022 until the end of June. In July 2021, he moved to Defensores de Belgrano on loan until the end of 2022.

Career statistics
.

References

External links

1997 births
Living people
People from Curuzú Cuatiá
Argentine footballers
Association football forwards
Argentine Primera División players
Primera Nacional players
Quilmes Atlético Club footballers
Argentinos Juniors footballers
Club Atlético Platense footballers
Defensores de Belgrano footballers
Sportspeople from Corrientes Province